Justyna Iskrzycka (born 7 November 1997) is a Polish sprint canoeist. At the 2020 Summer Olympics, she won a bronze medal in  Women's K-4 500 metres. At the 2019 European Games, she won a bronze medal

Career 
She participated at the 2018 ICF Canoe Sprint World Championships, winning a medal. She competed at the 2017 ICF Canoe Sprint World Championships,  2018 ICF Canoe Sprint World Championships, and 2019 ICF Canoe Sprint World Championships.

References

External links
 

Living people
1997 births
Polish female canoeists
ICF Canoe Sprint World Championships medalists in kayak
European Games competitors for Poland
Canoeists at the 2019 European Games
Sportspeople from Bielsko-Biała
Olympic canoeists of Poland
Canoeists at the 2020 Summer Olympics
Medalists at the 2020 Summer Olympics
Olympic bronze medalists for Poland
Olympic medalists in canoeing
21st-century Polish women
20th-century Polish women